St. Michael is a city in eastern Wright County, northwest of the Minneapolis-St Paul "Twin Cities" Metropolitan Area. The population was 18,235 at the 2020 census.

Geography

The Crow River flows along the city's eastern boundary, separating it from the city of Rogers in Hennepin County.  It also borders Monticello Township, Buffalo Township, Rockford Township, and the cities of Otsego and Albertville, all in Wright County, as well as the city of Hanover, which is located within both Wright and Hennepin counties.

Infrastructure

Transportation
Interstate 94, US Highway 52, and Minnesota State Highway 241 are three of the main routes in the city.

History
A post office called St. Michael has been in operation since 1858. The city took its name from St. Michael Roman Catholic Church. St. Michael was incorporated in 1890. The Corner Bar, a restaurant in service since 1897, was on 10 Main Street South downtown which shut down January 9, 2020 and was razed on Friday, August 14, 2020. Generational patrons drove by and many stopped to collect a brick or two to commemorate the end of this era. Oddly enough the founding father of Ditto's Bar, down the street from the Corner Bar, also left this earth days later while the name and establishment still live on in Main Street. A complete history of the city, ‘’Faith, Family and Farming’’, was written by Bob Zahler. The history is also tracked by the St. Michael Historical Society, whose mission is "to collect, preserve and share the history of the City of St. Michael."

Education
St. Michael is part of St. Michael–Albertville Independent School District#885. The St. Michael–Albertville school colors are royal blue and gold and the mascot is the Knight. The district consists of seven schools and two alternative academies. The seven schools include St. Michael-Albertville High School (Grades 9–12), St. Michael–Albertville Middle School East (Grades 5–8), St. Michael–Albertville Middle School West (Grades 5–8), St. Michael Elementary School (Grades 1–4), Fieldstone Elementary School (Grades 1–4), Big Woods Elementary School (Grades 1–4), and Albertville Primary School (Kindergarten). The two academies are Page Academy (Middle School alternative) and the Knights' Academy (High School alternative). There is also a private Catholic school in St. Michael for grades K–8, including preschool.

A new high school opened for the 2009–10 school year, and a dedication ceremony took place on September 20, 2009. The previous high school was converted into a new middle school (Middle School West). The current middle school has been renamed Middle School East.

Demographics

2010 census
As of the census of 2010, there were 16,399 people, 5,239 households, and 4,367 families living in the city. The racial makeup of the city was 93.3% White, 1.9% African American, 0.2% Native American, 2.4% Asian, 0.6% from other races, and 1.6% from two or more races. Hispanic or Latino of any race were 1.9% of the population.

There were 5,239 households, of which 53.0% had children under the age of 18 living with them, 73.1% were married couples living together, 6.6% had a female householder with no husband present, 3.7% had a male householder with no wife present, and 16.6% were non-families. 12.4% of all households were made up of individuals, and 3.4% had someone living alone who was 65 years of age or older. The average household size was 3.13 and the average family size was 3.43.

The median age in the city was 33.4 years. 34.8% of residents were under the age of 18; 5.2% were between the ages of 18 and 24; 31.7% were from 25 to 44; 21.9% were from 45 to 64; and 6.3% were 65 years of age or older. The gender makeup of the city was 50.7% male and 49.3% female.

2000 census
As of the census of 2000, there were 9,099 people, 2,926 households, and 2,437 families living in the city. The population density was 279.4 people per square mile (107.9/km).  There were 3,058 housing units at an average density of 93.9 per square mile (36.3/km).  The racial makeup of the city was 98.46% White, 0.03% African American, 0.16% Native American, 0.51% Asian, 0.16% from other races, and 0.67% from two or more races. Hispanic or Latino of any race were 0.98% of the population. 49.9% were of German, 8.7% Norwegian, 7.0% Irish, 6.9% United States or American and 5.7% Swedish ancestry.

There were 2,926 households, out of which 51.9% had children under the age of 18 living with them, 75.1% were married couples living together, 5.6% had a female householder with no husband present, and 16.9% were non-families. 11.3% of all households were made up of individuals, and 3.6% had someone living alone who was 65 years of age or older.  The average household size was 3.09 and the average family size was 3.40.

In the city, the population was spread out, with 34.6% under the age of 18, 6.3% from 18 to 24, 37.7% from 25 to 44, 16.0% from 45 to 64, and 5.5% who were 65 years of age or older.  The median age was 31 years. For every 100 females, there were 103.3 males.  For every 100 females age 18 and over, there were 100.2 males

The median income for a household in the city was $69,903, and the median income for a family was $74,236. Males had a median income of $46,488 versus $32,402 for females. The per capita income for the city was $24,742.  About 1.4% of families and 2.7% of the population were below the poverty line, including 3.1% of those under age 18 and 10.0% of those age 65 or over.

Politics

Notable people
 Dick Bremer – Sports broadcaster for the Minnesota Twins; resides in St. Michael.
 Chad Gable – Professional wrestler for the WWE.
 Father Paul Benno Marx – Roman Catholic priest and Benedictine monk, family sociologist, writer, and pro-life movement leader. Born in St. Michael.
 Robert O. McEachern (1927-2008) - schoolteacher and Minnesota state legislator. Lived in St. Michael and was the mayor of St. Michael
 Mitch Potter – Track and field athlete, competed at the University of Minnesota, and with Team USA.  Born in St. Michael and current resident
 Matt Spaeth – American football tight end for the Pittsburgh Steelers and Chicago Bears of the NFL.  St. Michael–Albertville High School alumni. Born in St. Michael.
 Caleb Truax – Professional boxer; born in Osseo and resides in St. Michael.

References

External links
 City of St. Michael website
 City of St. Michael Summer Festival website
 St. Michael Historical Society

Cities in Wright County, Minnesota
Cities in Minnesota